Sauer 200 is a bolt action rifle introduced by SIG Sauer in 1984 and produced until 1993. The rifle was one of the first consumer rifles with easily replaceable barrels. Sauer 200 has also been sold in Scandinavia under the name Carl Gustaf CG 4000.

In 1993, Sauer 200 was replaced by its Sig Sauer 202. The two rifles have many similarities, and for example, barrels are interchangeable.

The rifle Sig Sauer 200 STR, which is the standard firearm within Det frivillige Skyttervesen, is partly based on Sauer 200.

See also 
 Sauer 90
 Husqvarna 1900

References 

Rifles of Germany